The Gelasian is an age in the international geologic timescale or a stage in chronostratigraphy, being the earliest or lowest subdivision of the Quaternary Period/System and Pleistocene Epoch/Series. It spans the time between 2.58 Ma (million years ago) and 1.80 Ma. It follows the Piacenzian Stage (part of the Pliocene) and is followed by the Calabrian Stage.

Definition
The Gelasian was introduced in the geologic timescale in 1998. It is named after the Sicilian city of Gela in the south of the island. In 2009 it was moved from the Pliocene to the Pleistocene so that the geologic time scale would be more consistent with the key changes in Earth's climate, oceans, and biota that occurred 2.58 million years ago.

The base of the Gelasian is defined magnetostratigraphically as the base of the Matuyama (C2r) chronozone (at the Gauss-Matuyama magnetostratigraphic boundary), isotopic stage 103. Above this line notable extinctions of the calcareous nanofossils occur: Discoaster pentaradiatus and Discoaster surculus. The GSSP for the Gelasian is located at the Monte Sant Nicola near Gela.

The top of the Gelasian is defined magnetostratigraphically as the end of the Olduvai (C2n) chronozone, and faunally as the extinction level of the calcareous nanofossil Discoaster brouweri (base of biozone CN13). Above the Gelasian as the first occurrences of the calcareous nanofossil Gephyrocapsa sp. and the extinction level of the planktonic foraminifer Globigerinoides extremus

Climate 
During the Gelasian the ice sheets in the Northern Hemisphere began to grow, which is seen as the beginning of the Quaternary ice age. Deep sea core samples have identified approximately 40 marine isotope stages (MIS 103 – MIS 64) during the age. Thus, there have probably been about 20 glacial cycles of varying intensity during the Gelasian.

Europe 
In the regional glacial history of the Alps, this age is now called Biber. It corresponds to Pre-Tegelen and Tegelen in Northern Europe.

During the Gelasian, the Red Crag Formation of Butley, the Newbourn Crag, the Norwich Crag Formation and the Weybourne Crag Formation (all from East Anglia, England) were deposited. The Gelasian is an equivalent of the Praetiglian and Tiglian Stages as defined in the Netherlands, which are commonly used in northwestern Europe.

References

Notes

Literature
 (eds.) (2005) A Geologic Time Scale 2004, Cambridge University Press, Cambridge, UK, 
; 1998. The Gelasian Stage (Upper Pliocene): A new unit of the global standard chronostratigraphic scale. Episodes, 21(2): 82-87

 
Pleistocene geochronology
Geological ages